Larry Gene Carter (born May 22, 1965) is an American professional baseball pitcher and coach. He is formerly the bullpen coach for the Kansas City Royals of Major League Baseball (MLB). He played in the San Francisco Giants organization for six years and made his major league debut in 1992.

Career
He was named Texas League Pitcher of the year in 1991 while playing for the Shreveport Captains. He was originally drafted in the tenth round by the St. Louis Cardinals in 1986.

After his playing career was completed, Carter began work as a pitching coach within the Kansas City Royals minor league system. 2015 will be Carter's 18th season in the Royals organization including 11 years at the Double-A level, with Wichita (2002–07) and Northwest Arkansas (2008–12).

He was a member of three recent Championship teams, with the Triple-A Omaha Storm Chasers in 2014 and 2013, and with the Double-A Northwest Arkansas Naturals in 2010. He is credited with assisting in the tutelage of several of the Royals current pitchers, including Danny Duffy, Yordano Ventura, Kelvin Herrera, and Greg Holland. Larry was also the recipient of the "Mike Coolbaugh Texas League Coach of the Year" in the 2008 season. He also was named the Royals' 2014 Dick Howser Player Development Person of the Year.

He served as the Royals' minor league pitching coordinator from 2015 through 2019. He was promoted to bullpen coach of the Royals prior to the 2020 season.

Personal

Carter was born in Charleston, WV and grew up in Rand, graduating from Ravenswood High School. After earning all-state honors at Ravenswood, he played at Alderson-Broaddus College for two years and transferred to West Virginia State, where he sat out a year and then pitched the 1986 season for the State. He played one season at West Virginia State before getting drafted into pro baseball. Today, he lives with his wife Jennifer, sons Matthew and Andrew, and their two weimaraners in suburban Dallas. In his spare time, he enjoys rooting for the Pittsburgh Steelers and West Virginia Mountaineers.

References

External links

1965 births
Living people
Sportspeople from Charleston, West Virginia
Baseball coaches from West Virginia
Baseball players from West Virginia
Major League Baseball pitchers
Major League Baseball bullpen coaches
San Francisco Giants players
Kansas City Royals coaches
West Virginia State Yellow Jackets baseball players
Johnson City Cardinals players
Clinton Giants players
Everett Giants players
Salinas Spurs players
Shreveport Captains players
Phoenix Firebirds players
Tyler Wildcatters players
Minor league baseball coaches